In geometry, the Clifton–Pohl torus is an example of a compact Lorentzian manifold that is not geodesically complete. While every compact Riemannian manifold is also geodesically complete (by the Hopf–Rinow theorem), this space shows that the same implication does not generalize to pseudo-Riemannian manifolds. It is named after Yeaton H. Clifton and William F. Pohl, who described it in 1962 but did not publish their result.

Definition
Consider the manifold  with the metric

Hence the quotient  which is topologically the torus, is a Lorentz surface that is called the Clifton–Pohl torus.

Geodesic incompleteness
It can be verified that the curve

is a geodesic of M that is not complete (since it is not defined at ). Consequently,  (hence also ) is geodesically incomplete, despite the fact that  is compact. Similarly, the curve

is a null geodesic that is incomplete.

The geodesic incompleteness of the Clifton–Pohl torus is better seen as a direct consequence of the fact that  is extendable, i.e. that it can be seen as a  subset of a bigger Lorentzian surface. It is a direct  consequence of a simple change of coordinates. With

 

consider

The metric  (i.e. the metric  expressed in the coordinates ) reads

 

The surface , known as the extended Clifton–Pohl plane, is geodesically complete.

Conjugate points
The Clifton–Pohl tori are also remarkable by the fact that they were the first known non-flat Lorentzian tori with no conjugate points. The extended Clifton–Pohl plane contains a lot of pairs of conjugate points, some of them being in the boundary of  i.e.
Recall also that, by a theorem of E. Hopf no such tori exists in the Riemannian setting.

References

Lorentzian manifolds